Lahash may refer to:

Lahash, Iran, in Mazandaran Province, Iran
Lahash, Gilan, in Gilan Province, Iran
A Christian ministry Lahash International